The Department of Civil Aviation (DCA) is an agency of the Ministry of Communications and Works (Cyprus). Its head office is in Nicosia. 

The agency was established in 1955.

References

External links
 Department of Civil Aviation
 Department of Civil Aviation 
1955 establishments in Cyprus
Civil aviation authorities in Europe
Government of Cyprus